Carlos Rodrigues may refer to:

 Carlos Rodrigues (footballer, born 1908), Portuguese former footballer
 Carlos dos Santos Rodrigues (born 1995), also known as Carlos Ponck or simply Ponck, Cape Verdean footballer
 Carlos Rodrigues (gymnast) (born 1997), Angolan trampolinist
  (born 1957), Brazilian bishop and politician
 Carlitos Rodrigues (born 1981), Portuguese footballer

See also
 Carlos Rodríguez (disambiguation)